Tevfik Gelenbe (1931, Istanbul – 20 October 2004, Istanbul) was a well-known and prolific Turkish actor and comedian.

He was born in Istanbul, Turkey. He is best known for his character "Bacı Kalfa" in the 1980s TV serial Uğurlugil Ailesi. He was also the founder, in 1969, of the organization "Tevfik Gelenbe Tiyatrosu", which provided free theatre education to young actors. He died at the age of 73 due to complications of cancer.

References
 Sinematurk.com - Brief biography of Tevfik Gelenbe 
 Radikal Newspaper Online - News on Tevfik Gelenbe's death 

1931 births
2004 deaths
Vefa High School alumni
Turkish male television actors
Deaths from cancer in Turkey